IBM ThinkPad 240 is an ultra-portable laptop computer designed and produced by IBM from June 1999 to 2001. It is one of the few ThinkPad 200 series models made available in America and was the smallest and lightest ThinkPad model produced to date. The 240 series was discontinued, and it (as well as the 570 series) was replaced with the ThinkPad X series in 2000.

Features
The first 240 series models included the 300 MHz Mobile Celeron processor, 64 MB built-in RAM and one slot for memory expansion (maximum 320 MB). The laptop also was one of the first to feature the Mini PCI card slot. No built-in optical drive or diskette drive was included due to size limitations. External drive access was via a USB 1.0 port and/or the IBM external floppy drive connector. The unit shipped either with a standard 6 GB hard disk drive or with the 12 GB upgrade option.

All 240 series models feature a 10.4 TFT display, and the first models featured NeoMagic MagicGraph128XD graphics chips with 2 MB of video memory. The 240 is capable of displaying up to SVGA (800x600) on the TFT display, with XGA output available to an external monitor. All 240s also have audio controllers and VGA ports to connect to external display devices.

Models

Reception 
A review from the South China Morning Post in December 1999 appreciated the compactness and portability of the ThinkPad 240. It also noted the short battery life and that it only has a single Type II PC Card slot.

Transmeta Crusoe 
At the June 2000 PC Expo in New York, IBM demonstrated a ThinkPad 240 with a Transmeta Crusoe. In November, it was announced that IBM would not be using the Transmeta CPU in a 240. According to a source close to Transmeta, this was due to pressure from Intel.

References

Further reading 

 A retro 'ThinkPad Classic' could be a killer laptop not crippled by insane thinness
 ThinkWiki.de
 ThinkPad 240 internals & maintenance
 ThinkPad 240 Hardware Maintenance Manual
 ThinkPad 240X Hardware Maintenance Manual

ThinkPad 240
240